"Rock Star"  is a song by British-Australian recording artist Reece Mastin, taken from his second studio album, Beautiful Nightmare (2012). It was released digitally on 5 October 2012, as the third single from the album. "Rock Star" was written by Mastin, Brian Howes and Rune Westberg, who also produced the song. "Rock Star" peaked at number 16 in Australia and number 14 in New Zealand. It was certified platinum by the Australian Recording Industry Association (ARIA), denoting sales of 70,000 copies.

Composition and reception
"Rock Star" is a pop rock song that features "American sounding guitar riffs". A writer for Take 40 Australia likened the song's sound to Wheatus and Jimmy Eat World. Cameron Adams of the Herald Sun noted that it "channels" Wheatus' "Teenage Dirtbag" (2000) Avril Lavigne's "Sk8er Boi" (2002). Jamie Horne of The Border Mail described "Rock Star" as "super-likable". Scott Murphy of Smurphy Reviews refereed the song as having "Beautiful lyrical execution". A writer for The Hot Hits wrote that the song "does not disappoint".

"Rock Star" debuted at number 31 on the ARIA Singles Chart dated 15 October 2012. The following week, it peaked at number 16. On the New Zealand Singles Chart, the song debuted and peaked at number 14. "Rock Star" was certified platinum by the Australian Recording Industry Association (ARIA), denoting sales of 70,000 copies.

Music video
The accompanying music video for "Rock Star" premiered on Vevo on 9 October 2012.

Track listing
Digital download 
"Rock Star" – 2:58

CD single
"Rock Star" – 2:58
"Good Night" (Acoustic)
"Shut Up & Kiss Me" (Acoustic)
"Message in a Bottle" (Acoustic)

Credits and personnel
Credits adapted from the liner notes of Beautiful Nightmare.

Locations
Mastered at Studios 301 in Sydney.

Personnel
Songwriting – Reece Mastin, Brian Howes, Rune Westberg
Production – Rune Westberg
Mixing – Rune Westberg
Mastering – Leon Zervos

Charts and certifications

Weekly charts

Year-end chart

Certifications

Release history

References

2012 singles
Reece Mastin songs
2012 songs
Songs written by Brian Howes
Songs written by Rune Westberg
Sony Music Australia singles